Terrence Staples (Terry) Millar (September 18, 1948 – March 9, 2019) was professor emeritus of mathematics and former associate dean for physical sciences in the Graduate School and assistant to the provost at the University of Wisconsin–Madison.  He joined the math faculty in 1976 after serving two years in the Marines and obtaining a Ph.D. from Cornell University.  Millar retired in 2015 and was considered to be one of the world's foremost researchers in computable model theory.

Biography
He earned a bachelor’s degree in mathematics from Cornell University in 1970 and his Ph.D. in Mathematics from Cornell University in 1975.

Millar died March 9, 2019, at the age of 70 due to pancreatic cancer.

Career
Along with physics professors Sau Lan Wu and Wesley Smith (academic), he was “was central to Wisconsin’s contribution to development of the Large Hadron Collider.”  Working alongside Francis Halzen, he was “integral in launching the IceCube South Pole Neutrino Observatory.”

References

1948 births
2019 deaths
20th-century American mathematicians
Cornell University alumni
21st-century American mathematicians
Mathematicians from Wisconsin
Deaths from pancreatic cancer
Deaths from cancer in Wisconsin
University of Wisconsin–Madison faculty